The 2006 Bowling Green Falcons football team represented Bowling Green State University in the 2006 NCAA Division I FBS football season. The team was coached by Gregg Brandon and played their home games in Doyt Perry Stadium in Bowling Green, Ohio. It was the 88th season of play for the Falcons.

Schedule

Roster

References

Bowling Green
Bowling Green Falcons football seasons
Bowling Green Falcons football